Filip Krovinović (born 29 August 1995) is a Croatian professional footballer who plays as a midfielder for Prva HNL club Hajduk Split.

Club career

NK Zagreb
Krovinović, coming from the NK Zagreb academy, made his Prva HNL debut against GNK Dinamo Zagreb on 5 April 2013, signing a 5-year professional contract with the team soon after. In summer 2015 due to increasing financial problems at NK Zagreb and transfer window moving towards the end, more intensively was media rumor of transfer move to Dinamo Zagreb and especially to Hajduk Split. But compensation fee of €400,000 plus a percentage on future transfer NK Zagreb was seeking were not realized. In the end, both Krovinović and NK Zagreb accepted transfer bid from Portugal.

Rio Ave
On 30 August 2015, Krovinović signed a four-year contract with Portuguese club Rio Ave of the Primeira Liga. He went to Portugal at the late end of summer transfer window and joined Rio Ave team who by then had a series of positive results. Regular Croatian under 21 national team member made his debut for Rio Ave on 10 October 2015 in starting eleven against Vitória de Guimarães in home league cup match won by Rio Ave 3–2. In next three months Krovinović gathered only seven appearances, one of which was the away league cup match on 29 December 2015 against Leixões that Rio Ave won 2–1. For a second time that season Krovinović played all 90 minutes being one of the match heroes. Young midfielder was in process of adjusting to demands of Primeira Liga and Rio Ave gradually receiving more and more playing time. The next two months Krovinović managed to gather 10 more appearances while scoring twice.

His first goal for Rio Ave came on 13 January 2016 in quarter-final national cup match against Estoril in which he scored second goal of the game in 3–0 home victory seeing Rio Ave progress to semi-finals of Portuguese Cup. A week later he scored his second goal in a 1–1 home league cup draw with Belenenses. Last appearance in 2015–16 season, making a total of 17 appearances in his first season with Rio Ave was on 7 March 2016 in round 25 of Primeira Liga against Estoril as a half-time substitute in home defeat 3–1. Since then, Krovinović was oddly removed from starting eleven and even from the bench in most occasions, being so excluded from the squad for the rest of the season and its end. Despite the fact that he did not play in any Rio Ave official match for next three months, Krovinović made a great progress advancing in various technical and tactical segments bracing himself for very fast, technically polished football played in Primeira Liga.

With the end of 2015–16 campaign and replacement of coach Pedro Martins by coach Capucho on 20 May 2016, Krovinović received a number 10 jersey at the beginning of the 2016–17 season, thus acknowledging high expectations the club had for him in becoming one of the more important players for the team in an upcoming season. With the arrival of new coach Luís Castro, Krovinović started to play more scoring two goals this season so far.

Benfica
On 14 June 2017, Krovinović signed a five-year contract with Portuguese champions Benfica. He won the 2018–19 Primeira Liga with them in his second season at the club.

Loans to West Bromwich Albion
After winning the league title with Benfica, Krovinović was loaned out to West Bromwich Albion in the EFL Championship, initially for one season. After returning to his parent club over the summer, Benfica agreed another season-long loan with West Brom. On 4 October 2020, Krovinović made his Premier League debut as a substitute for Romaine Sawyers in a 0–2 away defeat by Southampton.

Loan to Nottingham Forest
On 22 January 2021, Krovinović was recalled from his loan at West Bromwich Albion and immediately loaned to Nottingham Forest for the remainder of the 2020-21 season. He scored his first goal for Nottingham Forest in a 1-1 draw with Brentford on 20 March 2021.

Hajduk Split 
On 19 July 2021, Krovinović returned to the Croatian Football League, signing with HNK Hajduk Split. He signed a contract until the summer of 2024 and picked jersey number 23. In his first season with Hajduk, Krovinović won the 2021–22 Croatian Football Cup.

International career
On 1 September 2016 at Gradski stadion in Koprivnica Krovinović played 90 minutes for Croatia U21 in 2017 UEFA European Under-21 Championship qualification Group 6
home match against Sweden. Match ended in 1–1 draw with Krovinović missing to complete a goal at the opening when his shot was off target by a thin margin thus failing to gain advantage from Croats better start. Draw was a bit of disappointment and compromised the position and chances to qualify for European Under-21 Championship even though Croatia remained group leader.

Career statistics
Statistics accurate as of match played 26 January 2023.

Honours
NK Zagreb
 Druga HNL: 2013–14

Benfica
 Primeira Liga: 2018–19

Hajduk Split
 Croatian Cup: 2021–22

References

External links
 
 
 

1995 births
Living people
Footballers from Zagreb
Croatian footballers
Association football midfielders
Croatia youth international footballers
Croatia under-21 international footballers
NK Zagreb players
Croatian Football League players
First Football League (Croatia) players
Rio Ave F.C. players
S.L. Benfica footballers
Primeira Liga players
S.L. Benfica B players
Liga Portugal 2 players
West Bromwich Albion F.C. players
Nottingham Forest F.C. players
English Football League players
Premier League players
HNK Hajduk Split players
Croatian expatriate footballers
Croatian expatriate sportspeople in Portugal
Croatian expatriate sportspeople in England
Expatriate footballers in Portugal
Expatriate footballers in England